Kalējs (feminine: Kalēja) is a Latvian occupational surname, derived from the Latvian word for "blacksmith". Individuals with the surname include:

Aivars Kalējs (born 1951), Latvian composer, organist and pianist
Konrāds Kalējs (1913–2001), a Latvian soldier and a Nazi collaborator
Jānis Kalējs (born 1965), a Latvian film director

Latvian-language masculine surnames
Occupational surnames